The Journal of South Texas is a biannual peer-reviewed academic journal published for the South Texas Historical Association by Texas A&M University-Kingsville. The editor-in-chief is Alberto Rodriguez (Texas A&M University-Kingsville). It was established in 1974 and covers the history and heritage of greater Texas.

References

External links

History of the United States journals
Biannual journals
English-language journals
History of Texas